Between Heaven and Hell may refer to:

 Between Heaven and Hell (film), a 1956 film directed by Richard Fleischer
 Between Heaven and Hell (novel), a 1982 novel by Peter Kreeft
 "Between Heaven and Hell" (song), a 1996 song by Zakk Wylde
 Between Heaven and Hell (album), an album by Firewind
 Between Heaven 'n Hell, a 1985 album by Resurrection Band
 Between Heaven and Hell, an album by Black Sabbath
 Between Heaven and Hell, the original title of the soap opera, One Life to Live
 Between Heaven and Hell: The Story of a Thousand Years of Artistic Life in Russia, a book by W. Bruce Lincoln
 "Between Heaven and Hell", theme song written by Rob Saffi, for the television show Paranormal Lockdown